Sarah Lagger (born 3 September 1999 in Spittal an der Drau) is an Austrian athlete competing in the combined events. As a junior she won a gold medal in the heptathlon at the 2016 World U20 Championships and a silver at the 2018 edition.

International competitions

Personal bests
Outdoor
200 metres – 24.53 (-0.5 m/s, Cali 2015)
800 metres – 2:11.53 (Tampere 2018)
100 metres hurdles – 13.98 (+0.9 m/s, Linz 2017)
High jump – 1.79 (Wels 2015)
Long jump – 6.31 (+0.6 m/s, Kapfenberg 2015)
Shot put – 15.23 (Gävle 2019)
Javelin throw – 50.32 (Eisenstadt 2020)
Heptathlon – 6225 (Tampere 2018)
Indoor
60 metres – 7.81 (Linz 2017)
800 metres – 2:14.05 (Vienna 2018)
60 metres hurdles – 8.50 (Linz 2018)
High jump – 1.77 (Linz 2018)
Long jump – 6.18 (Vienna 2019)
Shot put – 14.98 (Linz 2020)
Pentathlon – 4372 (Linz 2019)

References

1999 births
Living people
Austrian heptathletes
People from Spittal an der Drau
Athletes (track and field) at the 2015 European Games
European Games gold medalists for Austria
European Games medalists in athletics
Sportspeople from Carinthia (state)